Paulius Andrijauskas (born 29 September 1984) is a Lithuanian swimmer, who specialized in butterfly events. He currently holds two Lithuanian records in the 200 m butterfly (2:01.98), and 4×200 m freestyle relay (7:25.37) from the 2007 FINA World Championships in Melbourne, Australia.

Andrijauskas qualified for the men's 200 m butterfly at the 2004 Summer Olympics in Athens, by eclipsing a FINA B-standard entry time of 2:03.20 from the national championships in Kaunas. He challenged seven other swimmers on the second heat, including Olympic veteran Vladan Marković of Serbia and Montenegro. He edged out Markovic to take a fifth spot by 0.13 of a second, outside his entry time of 2:04.64. Andrijauskas failed to advance into the semifinals, as he placed thirtieth overall in the preliminaries.

References

1984 births
Living people
Lithuanian male butterfly swimmers
Olympic swimmers of Lithuania
Swimmers at the 2004 Summer Olympics
Sportspeople from Panevėžys